John F. Mims (November 10, 1815 – April 30, 1856) sixth mayor of Atlanta and agent of the Georgia Railroad & Banking Company.

In the late 1840s he founded a flour mill with Lemuel Grant, Richard Peters and his younger brother William Peters but it didn't do well with competition from Mark A. Cooper's mill in north Georgia but was still important for the diversification of the city's enterprises. The wood-fired steam engine was used for the Confederate Powder Works in Augusta, Georgia.

As mayor he built the first city hall and commissioned the first city map, produced by Edward A. Vincent in 1853. An illness forced him to resign in October 1853 and a special election was held two weeks later. He died in 1856 and is buried at Oakland Cemetery.

References

Mayors of Atlanta
1815 births
1856 deaths
19th-century American politicians
Burials at Oakland Cemetery (Atlanta)